Lake MacDonnell is a salt lake on western Eyre Peninsula near the Nullarbor Plain. The closest town is Penong. It is the site of a former salt mine and the largest gypsum mine in Australia, on the largest gypsum deposit in the southern hemisphere.

Ore body
The gypsum formed during the Holocene period.

The gypsum deposit has a one-metre layer of gypsarenite containing 93 percent gypsum (calcium sulphate). Below that is a  layer of selenite containing 94-96% calcium sulphate.

Mine

Gypsum has been mined at Lake MacDonnell since 1919. The gypsum mine has been owned since 1984 by Gypsum Resources Australia (GRA). GRA is owned 50% each by USG Boral (a 50/50 joint venture of USG Corporation and Boral) and CSR Limited. 

Gypsum is mined using bulldozers and excavation equipment. It is stockpiled for several years to allow salt to leach out from natural rainfall. It is then loaded onto trains using front-end loaders.

Gypsum is transported  by three trains per day from Kevin to the port of Thevenard. Kevin is the name of the station on the Eyre Peninsula Railway network established for the mines, named from the Hundred of Kevin (which in turn was named for the adopted son of Charles Cameron Kingston). It is stockpiled at Thevenard, then loaded onto ships to Glebe Island in Sydney for further processing.

See also

 List of lakes of South Australia

References

MacDonnell
Mines in South Australia
Gypsum mines in Australia